Weeping Willow is a 2014 Turkish animated short film directed by Ethem Onur Bilgiç, and produced by Mimar Sinan Fine Arts University. It is an animated free adaption of the Nâzım Hikmet poem, "Salkımsöğüt".

Plot 
There was a man; who fought through his entire life. He rode from one attack to another, marched on his horse. He was a brave soldier, fought with his pride. But maybe, it was time to watch the soldiers going along the setting sun under the shade of Weeping Willow.

Awards 
 21st International Golden Boll Film Festival, the Best Animated Short Film
 15th International İzmir Short Film Festival, the Best Animated Short Film

See also
 Nâzım Hikmet

References

External links
 Teaser on Vimeo

Turkish animated films
Turkish short films
Turkish animated short films
2014 animated films
2014 films
2010s animated short films
2014 short films